Walter Antonio Martínez Hernández (born December 14, 1967) is a Nicaraguan sport shooter. Martinez made his official debut at the 1996 Summer Olympics in Atlanta, where he placed forty-fourth in the men's 10 m air rifle, with a score of 566 points.

At the 2000 Summer Olympics in Sydney, Martinez was given a privilege and honor of carrying the national flag at the opening ceremony. He competed again for the second time in the 10 m air rifle, where he placed last again out of forty-six shooters in the qualifying rounds, with a slightly improved score of 571 points.

Martinez made a comeback from his eight-year absence at the 2008 Summer Olympics in Beijing, where he competed this time for two rifle shooting events. He placed fiftieth in the men's 10 m air rifle, with a total score of 569 points. Few days later, Martinez competed for his second event, 50 m rifle prone, where he placed fifty-fifth in the qualifying rounds, with a total score of 576 points, just one target ahead from his last attempt of Egypt's Hazem Mohamed.

References

External links
NBC 2008 Olympics profile

Nicaraguan male sport shooters
Living people
Olympic shooters of Nicaragua
Shooters at the 1996 Summer Olympics
Shooters at the 2000 Summer Olympics
Shooters at the 2008 Summer Olympics
Pan American Games competitors for Nicaragua
Shooters at the 2011 Pan American Games
1967 births